Danna Paola is the self-titled fourth studio album by Mexican actress and singer, Danna Paola. The album was released worldwide on June 5, 2012 by Universal Music via digital download and CD. Paola had an increasingly prominent role in the production, and it was an album transitioning away from her bubblegum pop sound and teen pop image from her previous three albums, and leaning increasingly towards more electronic sounds and romantic ballads.

Track listing

References

2012 albums
Danna Paola albums